MVTA can refer to:
 Martha's Vineyard Transit Authority
 Minnesota Valley Transit Authority
 Motor Vehicle Traffic Accident Still used in legacy healthcare clinical/diagnostic coding despite more-commonly being referred to as Motor Vehicle Collision (MCV).